The Hague dialect (Standard Dutch: Haags, het Haagse dialect; The Hague dialect: Haags, et Haagse dialek) is a dialect of Dutch mostly spoken in The Hague. It differs from Standard Dutch almost exclusively in pronunciation.

It has two subvarieties:
 Low-class plat Haags, generally spoken roughly south of the Laan van Meerdervoort;
 More posh dàftig, Haegs or bekakt Haags, generally spoken roughly north of the Laan van Meerdervoort.

Distribution

 Leyenburg
 Rustenburg en Oostbroek
 Morgenstond
 Bouwlust
 Vrederust
 Zuiderpark
 Moerwijk
 parts of Loosduinen
 Kraayenstein
 Houtwijk
 Waldeck
 Laakkwartier

Rijswijk and Voorburg are for the most part Haags-speaking.

Scheveningen has its own dialect (Schevenings), which is different than the traditional The Hague dialect. However, some people also speak The Hague dialect there, or a mixture between the Scheveningen dialect and The Hague dialect (Nieuw-Schevenings).

The dialect of Loosduinen (Loosduins) is very similar to The Hague dialect, and Ton Goeman classifies it as a separate dialect.

Some people also speak The Hague dialect in Zoetermeer. That is because an influx of people from The Hague to Zoetermeer took place in the 1960s, multiplying the population of the latter twelve times.

Spelling
Apart from Tilburg, The Hague is the only Dutch city with an official dialectal spelling, used e.g. in the Haagse Harry comic series written by Marnix Rueb.

Apart from that, The Hague dialect is rather rarely written. The Haagse Harry spelling works as follows:

 The second spelling is used before a syllable that starts with one consonant followed by a vowel.
 The second spelling is used before a syllable that starts with a vowel.
  is written  only when the word in the standard language has a single stem that ends in -en. Thus, standard ik teken "I draw" is written ik teiken, but standard de teken "the ticks" is written de teike.

Phonology

The sound inventory of The Hague dialect is very similar to that of Standard Dutch.

Vowels

 Among the back vowels,  are rounded, whereas  are unrounded.
 The long vowels  correspond to closing diphthongs  in Standard Dutch.
  may be realized as mid near-front .
  may be somewhat higher (closer to ) than in Standard Dutch, especially before .

 These diphthongs correspond to long vowels  in Belgian Standard Dutch. In Netherlandic Standard Dutch, they are diphthongized just as in The Hague dialect.
 Some speakers may realize them as wider diphthongs , which sound almost like Standard Dutch .
It is common, albeit stigmatized.
 Before ,  contrasts with  primarily by length for some speakers.

Consonants

  are bilabial, whereas  are labiodental.
 As in Standard Dutch, the speakers of The Hague dialect are inconsistent in maintaining the  contrast, and tend to merge these two phonemes into .  also occurs as an allophone of  before voiced consonants, or even between vowels.
 As in Standard Dutch,  are laminal .
  are velar, whereas  are post-velar  or pre-uvular . Both the place and the manner of articulation of  varies; see below.
 As in Standard Dutch, the speakers of The Hague dialect are inconsistent in maintaining the  contrast, and tend to merge these two phonemes into .
 As in Standard Dutch,  are alveolo-palatal, whereas  is palatal.
 As in Standard Dutch,  can be regarded simply as sequences .
 Some consonant clusters are simplified, e.g. nach  "night" (Standard Dutch nacht ).

Realization of 
They also state that "elision of the final  is common".
 According to :
 Alveolar realizations are practically non-existent. The only instances of alveolar  include an alveolar approximant , a voiced alveolar trill  and a voiceless alveolar tap , all of which occurred only once.
 Preconsonantal  in the syllable coda (as in warm) can be followed by a schwa  (warrem ). This is more common in older than younger speakers and more common in men than women.
 The stereotypical  realization of the coda  occurs only in about 2% cases.

Vocabulary
The following list contains only a few examples.

Sample

Harry-spelling
Et Haags is et stasdialek dat doâh de âhtogtaune "volleksklasse" van De Haag wogt gesprauke. Et behoâht tot de Zùid-Hollandse dialekte.

Standard Dutch spelling
Het Haags is het stadsdialect dat door de autochtone "volksklasse" van Den Haag wordt gesproken. Het behoort tot de Zuid-Hollandse dialecten.

Translation
The Hague dialect is a city dialect that is spoken by the autochthonous working class of The Hague. It belongs to the South Hollandic dialects.

Phonetic transcription

See also
Dutch dialect

References

Bibliography

Further reading

 

Dutch dialects
Languages of the Netherlands
Holland
Culture in The Hague